Vietnam competed at the 2013 World Championships in Athletics from August 10–18 in Moscow, Russia. One athlete was announced to represent the country in the event.

Results
Women
Track & road events

References

External links
IAAF World Championships – Vietnam

Nations at the 2013 World Championships in Athletics
World Championships in Athletics
Vietnam at the World Championships in Athletics